Mandurah is an electoral district of the Legislative Assembly in the Australian state of Western Australia.

The district is based on the coastal satellite city of Mandurah to the south of Perth.

The seat has switched between the major parties on a couple of occasions, but has recently become stronger for the Labor Party.

Geography
The district is a compact coastal electorate lying just to the south of the Metropolitan Region Scheme and north of the Peel Inlet. It includes the communities of Coodanup, Greenfields, Lakelands, Madora Bay, Mandurah, Meadow Springs, Parklands, San Remo, Silver Sands which lie to the west of the Mandurah Estuary. The district also extends across the estuary, to include parts of Barragup and Furnissdale.

History
First contested at the 1983 state election, Mandurah was won by Labor candidate John Read. Read lost the seat at the 1989 state election to Liberal candidate Roger Nicholls. Nicholls held the seat for three terms before his defeat at the 2001 state election to Labor candidate David Templeman, who holds the seat to this day.

Mandurah has long been regarded as a non-metropolitan district, despite its close proximity to Perth.  It is only 18 km south of Perth—close enough that it is part of the Perth television licence area. Before the one vote one value reforms that took effect at the 2008 state election, this meant that Mandurah had roughly half the enrolment of neighbouring districts to the north. Whilst Mandurah now contains a similar number of enrolled voters to most other electorates, this tradition lives on as it falls inside the non-metropolitan South West Legislative Council region.

The proposed 2011 redistribution would have seen Mandurah transferred to the South Metropolitan region.  It would have absorbed the outer southern Perth suburbs of Golden Bay and Singleton, while the more rural suburbs of Barragup and Furnissdale would have shifted to Murray-Wellington. However, the final boundaries left Mandurah in the South West region.

Members for Mandurah

Election results

References

External links
 ABC election profiles: 2005 2008 2013 2017

Mandurah
Mandurah